Beijing International Bilingual Academy (BIBA;  a.k.a. "Haijia International Bilingual School") is a private school in Shunyi District, Beijing, China. It serves students from kindergarten to high school. BIBA first opened its doors in 2006 as Kinstar International School.  The school's name was changed to Beijing International Bilingual Academy in 2011.  Its students can be Chinese nationals or holders of foreign passports. BIBA is a member of EduChina. It currently has 1600 students from more than 30 countries.

Accreditations and Authorizations 
BIBA is accredited, authorized, or a member of the following organizations:
 The International Middle Years Curriculum (IMYC)
 Cambridge International General Certificate of Secondary Education (IGCSE)
 The International Baccalaureate Diploma Program (IBDP)
 Association of China and Mongolia International Schools (ACAMIS)
 International Schools Athletic Conference (ISAC)
 East Asia Regional Council of Schools (EARCOS)
 Principals' Training Center for International School (PTC)
 Western Association of Schools and Colleges (WASC), a K-12 Accreditation

References

External links
 Beijing International Bilingual Academy
  Beijing International Bilingual Academy

International schools in Beijing
International Baccalaureate schools in China
2006 establishments in China
Educational institutions established in 2006